Ellen Mary Fanning (born 8 September 1967) is an Australian journalist, and currently the host of the news and current affairs program The Drum on ABC TV and ABC News Channel.

She was previously host of the Nine Network's Sunday television program.

Career
Fanning started a career in commercial radio in 1988, after graduating with a communications degree from the Queensland University of Technology. She later joined the ABC, presenting the ABC Radio National national current affairs program PM for two years, AM and occasionally The 7.30 Report on ABC TV.

After a stint producing the ABC's late-night current affairs program, Lateline, she was appointed one of the North America correspondents for the ABC network in 1997, based in Washington, D.C.

In 2000, Fanning moved to the Nine Network, working first as a reporter with 60 Minutes, then as a reporter for A Current Affair, before becoming a substitute presenter for A Current Affair and Today. In 2005, she became presenter of Nightline, replacing Helen Kapalos.

Fanning wrote and directed a six-part documentary series titled Fine Line for SBS TV in 2002. The series dealt with the ethical questions of journalism.

In 2006, Fanning became co-host of Sunday with Ross Greenwood, who was then replaced by Ray Martin in 2007. Martin left the Nine Network in 2008 leaving Fanning as the sole host of the program, alongside Michael Usher presenting the news and Stephanie Brantz presenting the latest sports news.

In 2013, Fanning hosted the 20-episode series The Observer Effect on SBS TV, and from September 2014 became the presenter of ABC Classic's Classic Breakfast, having replaced Ed Le Brocq.

In 2017, Fanning returned to ABC TV to become host of The Drum, a role she shares with Julia Baird.

Personal life
Fanning was born in Brisbane, Queensland, and attended All Hallows' School. She is married with two sons.

References

External links
 
 Ellen Fanning ABC interview

Nine News presenters
Australian radio journalists
Living people
Queensland University of Technology alumni
People from Brisbane
Australian television talk show hosts
ABC radio (Australia) journalists and presenters
Australian women television journalists
Women radio journalists
People educated at All Hallows' School
1967 births